The 3rd constituency of Mayenne is a French legislative constituency in the Mayenne département.

Historic representation

Election results

2022 

 
 
 
 
|-
| colspan="8" bgcolor="#E9E9E9"|
|-
 
 
 
 * Favennec stood for UDI as part of the centre-right UDC alliance at the 2017 election. Shortly before the 2022 election, he joined Horizons, a member party of Emmanuel Macron's centrist Ensemble alliance.

2017

2012

 
 
 
 
 
|-
| colspan="8" bgcolor="#E9E9E9"|
|-

2007

References

Sources
 Official results of French elections from 1998: 

3